Arturo Galcerán Nogués was a Cuban football midfielder who played for Cuba in the 1938 FIFA World Cup. He also played for Juventud Asturiana.

References

Cuban footballers
Cuba international footballers
Association football midfielders
1938 FIFA World Cup players
Year of birth missing